The 2020–21 SHL season was the 46th season of the Swedish Hockey League (SHL). The regular season began in September 2020 and ended on 3 April 2021, it was then followed by the playoffs and the relegation playoffs. The league consisted of the 14 teams that competed in the 2019–20 season; because of the COVID-19 pandemic in Sweden, no relegation or promotion took place after the previous season. The Växjö Lakers won the regular season for the third time in club history. In the SHL qualifier, Brynäs IF defeated HV71 in five games to stay in the SHL. The Växjö Lakers won the Le Mat Trophy for the third time, defeating Rögle BK by 4 games to 1 in the playoffs final.

Due to the COVID-19 pandemic in Sweden, many of the teams have had their players affected, causing many regular season games to be moved forward and the end of the regular season to be postponed multiple times.

Teams

Regular season
Each team played 52 games, playing each of the other thirteen teams four times: twice on home ice, and twice away from home. Points were awarded for each game, where three points were awarded for winning in regulation time, two points for winning in overtime or shootout, one point for losing in overtime or shootout, and zero points for losing in regulation time. At the end of the regular season, the team that finished with the most points was crowned the league champion.

Standings

Statistics

Scoring leaders

The following shows the top ten players who led the league in points, at the conclusion of the regular season. If two or more skaters are tied (i.e. same number of points, goals and played games), all of the tied skaters are shown.

Leading goaltenders
The following shows the top ten goaltenders who led the league in goals against average, provided that they have played at least 40% of their team's minutes, at the conclusion of the regular season.

Playoffs
Ten teams qualify for the playoffs: the top six teams in the regular season have a bye to the quarterfinals, while teams ranked seventh to tenth meet each other (7 versus 10, 8 versus 9) in a preliminary playoff round.

Format 
In the first round, the 7th-ranked team meets the 10th-ranked team and the 8th-ranked team meets the 9th-ranked team for a place in the second round. In the second round, the top-ranked team will meet the lowest-ranked winner of the first round, the 2nd-ranked team will face the other winner of the first round, the 3rd-ranked team will face the 6th-ranked team, and the 4th-ranked team will face the 5th-ranked team. In the third round, the highest remaining seed is matched against the lowest remaining seed. In each round the higher-seeded team is awarded home advantage. The meetings are in the first round played as best-of-three series, in the third round as best-of-five series and in the second and fourth rounds as best-of-seven series. In the eighth-finals, the higher-seeded teams play at home for game 2 (plus 3 if necessary) while the lower-seeded teams play at home for game 1. In the semi-finals, the higher-seeded teams are at home for games 1 and 2 (plus 5 if necessary) while the lower-seeded teams are at home for game 3 (plus 4 if necessary). In the quarter-finals and the finals, the higher-seeded teams are at home for games 1 and 2 (plus 5 and 7 if necessary) while the lower-seeded teams are at home for games 3 and 4 (plus 6 if necessary).

Playoff bracket

Eighth-finals

(7) Frölunda HC vs. (10) Djurgårdens IF

(8) Färjestad BK vs. (9) Malmö Redhawks

Quarter-finals

(1) Växjö Lakers vs. (8) Färjestad BK

(2) Rögle BK vs. (7) Frölunda HC

(3) Leksands IF vs. (6) Örebro HK

(4) Skellefteå AIK vs. (5) Luleå HF

Semi-finals

(1) Växjö Lakers vs. (6) Örebro HK

(2) Rögle BK vs. (4) Skellefteå AIK

Finals

(1) Växjö Lakers vs. (2) Rögle BK

Statistics

Scoring leaders
The following players led the league in points, at the conclusion of the playoffs. If two or more skaters are tied (i.e. same number of points, goals and played games), all of the tied skaters are shown.

Leading goaltenders
The following shows the top five goaltenders who led the league in goals against average, provided that they have played at least 40% of their team's minutes, at the conclusion of the playoffs.

Play Out
Teams 13 and 14 from the regular season played a best-of-seven series, with the winner remaining in the SHL and the loser relegated to the second tier, HockeyAllsvenskan. The higher-seeded team had home advantage over the series, playing at home for games 1 and 3 (plus 5 and 7 if necessary) while the lower-seeded team was at home for games 2 and 4 (plus 6 if necessary).

SHL awards

References

External links

2020-21
SHL
2020–21 in European ice hockey leagues